The Gosfield Wind Project is a 50.6 megawatt (MW) wind farm in Kingsville, Ontario, consisting of 22 2.3 MW Siemens SWT 2.3 wind turbines with 49 metre long blades. Construction was completed in October 2010 for CDN 149 million.

See also

List of wind farms in Canada
List of offshore wind farms

References

External links
Website
"Where is my Electricity Coming From at this Hour? (if I lived in Ontario)" (Canadian Nuclear Society, with data from IESO)

Wind farms in Ontario
Buildings and structures in Dufferin County